Miss Israel is a national beauty pageant in Israel. The pageant was founded in 1950, where the winners were sent to Miss Universe. The pageant was also existing to send delegates to Miss World, Miss International, Miss Europe and Miss Asia Pacific International. The 1965 competition was held in International Convention Center, Jerusalem, and had 21 contestants. Aliza Sadeh was the winner.

Results

External links

1965 beauty pageants
1965 in Israel
Miss Israel
1960s in Jerusalem